Dorothy Kathleen Benham  (born December 11, 1955) is an American beauty pageant titleholder from Edina, Minnesota who was Miss America 1977 and Miss Minnesota 1976.

Early life
Benham was born to Archie and Mary Dorothy Tuomi Benham. She attended Southwest High School in Minneapolis, MN and graduated in 1973. She sang in her high school choir. She has one sister named Totiana and two brothers, named Sean and Archibald.

Personal life
On May 26, 1978, she married Russell Anderson, an American ice hockey defenseman in the NHL who played for the Pittsburgh Penguins. The couple had four children, Adam (born 1980), Russell (born 1982), Ben (born 1985), and Mia (born 1988).

On December 31, 1991, she married Michael McGowan with whom she has two children, named Madeline (born 1994) and Richard (born 1995).

On August 28, 2001, she married Paul Shoemaker. The couple divorced in 2011.

Career
Benham appeared in the Tony award-winning Broadway musical, Jerome Robbins' Broadway in 1989 and also performed on the Crystal Cathedral television program, Hour of Power.

References

External links
Miss America official website
Our Family Tree Profile

1955 births
Living people
Miss America 1977 delegates
Miss America Preliminary Talent winners
Miss America winners
People from Edina, Minnesota
Female models from Minnesota
Actresses from Minnesota
21st-century American women